is a city in Japan, located in Fukuoka Prefecture, in the north Chikuzen region of the prefecture. The city was founded on April 1, 1981. As of April 30, 2022, the city has an estimated population of 97,098 and a population density of 810 persons per km2. The total area is 119.94 km2.

Efforts have been made to inculcate Japan-South Korea friendship, and also friendship with New Zealand in recent years.

History 

The origin of the name Munakata is said to be from "Minokatachi" or "Minokata" from the enshrinement of three Munakata goddesses, descended from sword of Susanoo-no-Mikoto and mentioned in the Kojiki.

The area has prospered from trade with China and Korea from ancient times. It has been a World Heritage Site (Okinoshima) at Munakata Shrine. Munakata Shrine specifies itself as the territory of the god of Kyūshū during the Asuka period — ranging from Onga in the east, south to Wakamiya and Miyata, and Shingū in the west.
During the age of civil wars a daimyō with leading Shinto priest and Munakata Ujisada of Munakata Shrine established Tsutagadake castle (Mount Jo). Through this, Munakata, Onga and Kurate were protected from invasion by other daimyos such as Tachibana Dōsetsu and the Ōtomo clan. There are also ghost stories connected with the area since the Yamada incident arose.

On March 28, 2005, the village of Ōshima (also from Munakata District) was absorbed into Munakata　city.

In the earthquake on March 20, 2005, damage was done in various parts of the city. The quake registered just under five on the Japan Meteorological Agency seismic intensity scale.

Geography

Mountain
 Mt. Joyama (Mt. Tsurugatake)
 Mt. Konomiyama
 Mt. Hakuzan
 Mt. Kodaishiyama
 Mt. Yugawayama
 Mt. Kanayama
 Mt. Shintateyama

Rivers
 Tsuri river

Climate
Munakata has a humid subtropical climate (Köppen: Cfa).

Demographics
Per Japanese census data, the population of Munakata in 2020 is 97,095 people. Munakata has been conducting censuses since 1950.

Twin towns – sister cities
  Gimhae city(South Gyeongsang Province, South Korea)(1992, sister city concluded. At the time of conclusion, former Munakata City.)
  Seongsan-eup, Seogwipo city(Jeju Province, South Korea)(1991, Friendship and Exchange City concluded. At the time of conclusion, former Genkai Town. At the time of conclusion, it was seongsan-eup, Namjeju County)
  Kazanlak(Stara Zagora Province, Bulgaria)(2010, Friendship and Exchange City concluded.)

Tourism

Akama
Akama (赤間) is a historical district and city center of Munakata. Half of the people in Munakata live there. It contains rows of old houses belonging, along with the original Akama hotel and two now-ruined castles: Hakusan Castle and Tsutagadake Castle. The Shinto priest and founder of Munakata Shrine was a local military leader in medieval times. It is also connected to the period in history when Saigō Takamori and Takasugi Shinsaku were in conflict with the national government.

The main JR Kyūshū train station in Munakata is called Akama, and is a part of the Kagoshima Main Line.  The city is also served by the Kyōikudaimae and Tōgō JR stations.

Sports facilities
Global Arena, which has hosted the Sanix World Rugby Youth Invitational Tournament since 2000
 Genkai Ground, which hosts the Munakata Sanix Blues rugby team

References

External links

 Munakata City official website 

 
Cities in Fukuoka Prefecture